General Pramono Edhie Wibowo (5 May 1955 – 13 June 2020) was an Indonesian military officer who served as the Chief of Staff of the Army from 31 June 2011 until 20 May 2013. He was the brother-in-law of former Indonesian president Susilo Bambang Yudhoyono. Before becoming Indonesian Army Chief of Staff, he was Commander of Army Strategic Command (Kostrad) (Pangkostrad), Commanding General of the Special Forces Command (Danjen Kopassus), Commander of the Military Territory III/Siliwangi, Chief of Staff of the Military Territory IV/Diponegoro, as well as Personal Aide of former Indonesian President, Megawati Soekarnoputri. He died at Cimacan Hospital, Cianjur Regency on 13 June 2020 due to a heart attack.

References 

Indonesian generals
Chiefs of Staff of the Indonesian Army
Javanese people
1955 births
2020 deaths